The honorable title prefix and style of "Colonel" is designated legally for various reasons by US governors in common law to citizens, employees, travelers and visitors within their states. The origins of the titular colonelcy can be traced back to colonial and antebellum times when men of the landed gentry were given the title to commission companies or for financing the local militias without actual expectations of command. This practice can actually be traced back to the English Renaissance when a colonelcy was purchased by a lord or prominent gentleman but the actual command would fall to a lieutenant colonel, who would deputize its members for the proprietor.

The authority and distinction of the title of Colonel dates back to 1651 with the Virginia Company. Literally a colonel was recognized during colonial times as a head of the colony, everyone else was a colonist or colonial. There were colonels of expedition companies, land companies, trading companies, county militias, farm communities, plantations and frontier forts. The only person above the colonial colonel was the Governor, this begins changing once the colonels during the Revolutionary War select and become the first US state governors, senators and congressmen under democratic principles.

There is an aristocratic tinge to the social usage of the title "Colonel", which most often today designates a southern gentleman, and is archetypal of the southern aristocrat from days past. There is also a different perceptive level of respect for colonels that are reciprocally addressed as "Honorable" or "Colonel" in writing style. While the honor of colonel in the civil usage has no actual military role, the title did evolve from the military.

By state
The US states that have conferred this title as an honor within the last half-century are Alabama, Georgia, Kentucky, Louisiana, Mississippi, New Mexico, New York, North Dakota, Oklahoma, South Carolina, Tennessee and Utah. Some of the titles hold different levels of authority and some expire at the end of the term of the governor. The most popular and widely awarded type of colonelcy is the "Kentucky Colonel". 

 Alabama Colonel – Alabama honor specifically makes one a colonel in the state militia.
 Georgia Colonel – Georgia's honorary title give its members a rank as aides-de-camp on the governor's staff codified in Official Code of Georgia Annotated 38-2-111;
 second to it is the rank of Georgia Lieutenant-Colonel
 Kentucky Colonel – Kentucky colonelcy dates back to 1775 with the commissioning of Daniel Boone by the Transylvania Company to build the Wilderness Road and establishing the first government in Kentucky. Kentucky colonels subsequently were the highest-authority in Kentucky until 1791 when they selected a new governor. The Commonwealth of Kentucky after becoming a state only commissioned uniformed ceremonial and militia colonels until 1895, when it officially adopted the title "Kentucky Colonel" with the style of Honourable as a civilian honor bestowed to its most noteworthy and outstanding citizens.
 Tennessee Colonel – The highest honor of Tennessee is "Colonel, Aide-de-camp". Those who receive this award are recorded by the Secretary of State of Tennessee with those who have been commissioned into the State Guard and Tennessee National Guard.

Texas once bestowed the honor as well, Texas Colonelcy was replaced with the honor of Admiral in the Texas Navy.

From 2005 to 2015 Illinois allowed for the Governor of the State to make appointments to the Governor's Regiment of Colonels, but no appointments were ever made.

Many states have provisions in their articles or bills concerning state defense forces which allow the governor to grant honorary membership of the officer ranks or granting honorary colonelcy to civilians in the common law of Colonial America.

Notable uses
There are over 1,000 businesses in the United States that use or have used the term "colonel" as part of their corporate name. 

"The Colonel" is also often a shorthand reference to restaurateur Colonel Harland David Sanders, the founder of the Kentucky Fried Chicken ("KFC") chain of franchised restaurants, whom Ruby Laffoon, Governor of the Commonwealth of Kentucky, commissioned a Kentucky colonel in 1935. There are well over 300 major celebrities that have been recognized with colonelcy, many of them never use the title.   

Another famous "colonel" was Colonel Thomas Parker, Elvis Presley's manager, who received his title from Governor Jimmie Davis of Louisiana as a reward for Parker's help in Davis's political campaign to be elected governor.  

Col. Edward Mandell House was an American diplomat, and an advisor to President Woodrow Wilson. He was known by the nickname "Colonel House", although he had performed no military service as a Texas Colonel. He was a highly influential back-stage politician in Texas before becoming a key supporter of the presidential bid of Wilson in 1912.  

Many other prominent people in the South used the title going all the way back to before the American Revolutionary War, the title was used frequently in all of the thirteen colonies.

See also
Title of honor
 Other honorary titles in U.S. states: 
Arkansas Traveler
Delaware title of Order of the First State of Delaware
Indiana title of Sagamore of the Wabash
Nebraska Admiral, formally Admiral in the Great Navy of the State of Nebraska
North Carolina title of Order of the Long Leaf Pine
Rhode Island Commodore
South Carolina titles of Order of the Palmetto and Order of the Silver Crescent
Texas title of Admiral in the Texas Navy
Washington State Leadership Board, formerly known as the Association of Washington Generals

References

External links
American Colonelcy at American Colonels Network

American awards
Honorary titles
State awards and decorations of the United States
Titles